Charles Edward Orman (6 September 1859 – 11 February 1927) was an English cricketer and soldier. He played two matches for Essex in 1896.

He was commissioned in 1878 from the Royal Military College, Sandhurst, and was promoted to major in the Essex Regiment in 1895. In 1893 he married Blanche Lintorn Simmons, daughter of Field Marshal Sir Lintorn Simmons. The family would later adopt the name of Lintorn-Orman. A daughter was Rotha Lintorn-Orman.

References

External links

1859 births
1927 deaths
Military personnel of British India
English cricketers
Essex cricketers
Essex Regiment officers
People from Haridwar district
Cricketers from Uttarakhand
19th-century sportsmen
Graduates of the Royal Military College, Sandhurst